Cecilia Wang Shi Shi (born 21 April 1981), also known as Cissy Wang, is a Hong Kong model who was crowned Miss Chinese Toronto Pageant in 2000. She is the wife of Donnie Yen.

Early life 
Wang was born in Hong Kong on 21 April 1981. Her parents were in the jewelry business. She has a younger sister named Irene Wang Yuen Yuen. They spent their childhood in Lima, Peru before moving to Canada. Wang speaks Cantonese, Mandarin Chinese, English, Spanish and French.

Career 
Wang was a contestant in the Fairchild TV Miss Chinese Toronto Pageant at Toronto in 2000 and won first place. She was also awarded Miss Photogenic, Most Talented Award and Best Posture Award.
She is the co-founder of Super Bullet Pictures and has been Manager to husband Donnie Yen.

Personal life
On 30 August 2003, Wang married Donnie Yen. They have two children: a daughter named Jasmine Yen, and a son named James Yen.

References

External links
 
 
 

1981 births
Living people
Hong Kong emigrants to Canada
Hong Kong female models
Hong Kong people